Prangli is an Estonian island in the Gulf of Finland.

The first records are from 1387  when it was called Rango. The first settlers came from Sweden. The Estonian culture spread to the island in the 17th century.

Prangli is part of Viimsi Parish. In Kelnase is a harbour which is connected by ferry to Leppneeme on the mainland.

The vegetation, especially in the east of the island is mainly fir trees.

The lighthouse on Prangli was built in 1923.

In 1941, the Estonian steamship Eestirand was shipwrecked off the coast of Prangli Island after a German air attack.  The Eestirand was part of a fleet of ships carrying Soviet troops to Leningrad during the Soviet evacuation of Tallinn. The Estonian crew and conscripts managed to disarm Soviet military personnel aboard the ship and take control of the island, hoisting the flag of the Estonian Republic up a tall pine tree. The revolt saved approximately 2,700 conscripts, most of which were Estonian, from being mobilized to Leningrad.  After the war, a memorial was placed on the island in honor of those who died in the tragedy.

Gallery

References

External links 

 Prangli Estonian Evangelical Church Prangli St. Laurentius Parish 
 Leuchtturm Prangli 
 Prangli

Estonian islands in the Baltic
Viimsi Parish
Gulf of Finland